Trident Force (also known as The Ultimate Solution) is a 1988 Filipino action film directed by Richard Smith and starring Anthony Alonzo, Nanna Anderson, Mark Gil, Steve Rogers, Eddie M. Gaerlan, Ronnie Patterson, Nick Nicholson, and Willy Schober. Produced by ANNA Films International, the film was released by Solar Films in the Philippines on December 16, 1988.

Critic Lav Diaz gave Trident Force a mixed review, deeming its competent filmmaking to be undermined by stereotypical villains and exaggerated characters.

Plot
The Trident Force, an international counter-terrorism organization, is called in to the Middle East to quell and defeat the Palestinian Revolutionary Legion by any means necessary.

Cast
Anthony Alonzo as Rashid
Nanna Anderson as Lesley Prentias
Mark Gil as Ahmed, Rashid's brother
Steve Rogers as Hawthorn
Eddie M. Gaerlan as Abu Hassad
Ronnie Patterson as Casey
Nick Nicholson as Ox
Willy Schober as Ibrahim Habash
Rafael Schulz as Trident Schulz
Tony Ogumsaya as Trident Robinson
Majid Jadali as Trident Majid
Randy Hrobar as Trident Harel
Jim Moss as Trident Parsons
Tony Lao as Trident Kimura
Gerald Tosco as Trident Dobouis
Carlos Terry as Trident Gomez
Mike Aguas as Trident Aguas
Salah Mahfoudi as Sultan of Qumarnesia
Paul Holmes as Israeli ambassador
Moshen Hassani as imam
Bahman Borzoo as ambassador to Jordan

Release
Trident Force was graded "C" by the Movie and Television Review and Classification Board (MTRCB) in the Philippines, indicating a "Fair" quality. The film was released by Solar Films in Philippine theaters on December 16, 1988. In the United States, the film was released on VHS by Diamond Entertainment. In Japan, the film was released on VHS by Herald Videogram. In Ghana, the film was theatrically released in 1994.

Critical response
Lav Diaz, writing for the Manila Standard, gave Trident Force a mixed review, considering its storytelling to be "direct and competent" while deeming the exaggerated characterizations and stereotypically dumb villains to be "childish" and trivializing.

References

External links

1988 films
1988 action films
Films about Islam
Films about terrorism in Asia
Films set in the Middle East
Philippine action films
1980s English-language films